Camerunia is a genus of moths in the family Eupterotidae from Africa. The genus was erected by Per Olof Christopher Aurivillius in 1893.

Species
Camerunia albida Aurivillius, 1901
Camerunia flava Aurivillius, 1904	 
Camerunia orphne (Schaus, 1893)

References

Janinae
Moth genera